Interferon regulatory factor 2 binding protein like is a protein that in humans is encoded by the IRF2BPL gene. Mutations are associated with neurological problems. More specifically, mutations of the gene cause the NEDAMSS syndrome, whose abbreviation stands for NEurodevelopmental Disorder with regression, Abnormal Movements, loss of Speech, and Seizures, first described in 2018.

References

External links
 
 Parent Group Europe http://irf2bpl.de

Further reading